Xenia Sackville, Lady Buckhurst (née Countess Xenia Nikolaievna Tolstoy-Miloslavsky; born 1980) is a British jewellery designer.

Biography 
Lady Buckhurst was born Countess Xenia Nikolaievna Tolstoy-Miloslavsky in 1980 in Yeovil to Count Nikolai Tolstoy and Georgia Brown. Her father is a former prospective parliamentary candidate for the UK Independence Party, Vice President of the Royal Stuart Society, and nominal head of the Tolstoy family. She was educated at Headington School, an all-girls boarding school in Headington, and at Downe House School, an all-girls boarding school in Cold Ash. After graduating, she spent a gap year working with children in Kenya. She then earned a degree from King's College, London.

In September 2009, Lady Buckhurst became engaged to William Sackville, Lord Buckhurst, the heir of William Sackville, 11th Earl De La Warr and a godson of Princess Margaret, Countess of Snowdon. They married on 5 February 2010 in a Russian Orthodox ceremony at  the Dormition Cathedral in London. She gave birth to their first child, William Lionel Robert Sackville, on 24 January 2014. She gave birth to a second child, Victoria Elizabeth Anne Sackville, on 6 June 2016.

She works as a jewellery designer.

References 

Living people
1980 births
Alumni of King's College London
Buckhurst
British jewellery designers
English Eastern Orthodox Christians
English people of Russian descent
English socialites
Countesses of the Russian Empire
Members of the Russian Orthodox Church
People educated at Downe House School
People educated at Headington School
Xenia
Xenia
Women jewellers